Marvin Joseph Garbis (born June 14, 1936) is a former United States district judge of the United States District Court for the District of Maryland.

Education and career

The grandson of Jewish immigrants, Garbis was born in Baltimore, Maryland, and received a Bachelor of Engineering Science from Johns Hopkins University in 1958, a Juris Doctor from Harvard Law School in 1961, and a Master of Laws from Georgetown University Law Center in 1962. He was a trial attorney in the Tax Division of the United States Department of Justice from 1962 to 1967. He was in private practice in Baltimore from 1967 to 1988, and in Washington, D.C., from 1988 to 1989.

Federal judicial service

On August 4, 1989, Garbis was nominated by President George H. W. Bush to a seat on the United States District Court for the District of Maryland, which was vacated by Judge Joseph H. Young. Garbis was confirmed by the United States Senate on October 24, 1989, and received his commission on October 25, 1989. He assumed senior status on June 14, 2003, and retired from active service on June 26, 2018.

Stone v. Trump

References

Sources

1936 births
Living people
20th-century American Jews
Johns Hopkins University alumni
Harvard Law School alumni
Georgetown University Law Center alumni
Judges of the United States District Court for the District of Maryland
United States district court judges appointed by George H. W. Bush
20th-century American judges
21st-century American Jews